String Quartet No. 6 may refer to:

 String Quartet No. 6 (Babbitt) by Milton Babbitt
 String Quartet No. 6 (Bartók) by Béla Bartók
 String Quartet No. 6 (Beethoven) by Ludwig van Beethoven
 String Quartet No. 6 (Diamond) by David Diamond
 String Quartet No. 6 (Dvořák) by Antonín Dvořák
 String Quartet No. 6 (Ferneyhough) by Brian Ferneyhough
 String Quartet No. 6 (Halffter) by Cristóbal Halffter
 String Quartet No. 6 (Hill) by Alfred Hill
 String Quartet No. 6 (McCabe), Silver Nocturnes, by John McCabe
 String Quartet No. 6 (Maconchy) by Elizabeth Maconchy
 String Quartet No. 6 (Mendelssohn) by Felix Mendelssohn
 String Quartet No. 6 (Milhaud), Op. 77, by Darius Milhaud
 String Quartet No. 6 (Mozart) by Wolfgang Amadeus Mozart
 String Quartet No. 6 (Porter) by Quincy Porter
 String Quartet No. 6 (Rihm) by Wolfgang Rihm
 String Quartet No. 6 (Schubert) by Franz Schubert
 String Quartet No. 6 (Shostakovich) by Dmitri Shostakovich
 String Quartet No. 6 (Spohr) by Louis Spohr
 String Quartet No. 6 (Villa-Lobos) by Heitor Villa-Lobos